The 2014 FIA Alternative Energies Cup was the eighth season of the FIA Alternative Energies Cup, a world championship for vehicles with alternative energy propulsion organized by the Fédération Internationale de l'Automobile.

For the fourth successive year, Massimo Liverani won the Category VII/VIII title for hybrid vehicles, despite winning only one of the seven events during the season. He won the championship by 24 points ahead of Guido Guerrini, who finished as the championship runner-up for the fourth successive year. Third place went to Kalin Dedikov, who won his home event in Bulgaria. The other wins were shared by Sylvain Blondeau, Txema Foronda, Massimo Zanasi, Gregor Zdovc, as well as Roberto Viganò, who was ineligible to score points towards the championship. Guerrini's co-driver Isabelle Barciulli was the winner of the co-drivers' championship, as Liverani used both Valeria Strada and Fulvio Ciervo during the season. Strada finished second to Barciulli, four points in arrears. Abarth were the winners of the manufacturers' championship.

In the all-electric Category III, it was Walter Kofler who claimed the championship title, after winning four out of the category's seven events. His tally of 50 points was over 4 times that of his nearest competitor, James Morlaix, who scored 11. Jesús Echave, Greg Jonkerlinck and Akash Makhan shared third place overall, with one-off category victories. Franco Gaioni was the winner of the co-drivers' championship, with Think the winners of the manufacturers' championship.

Calendar and winners

Championship standings

Drivers' championships

Category VII/VIII

Co-drivers' championships

Category VII/VIII

Manufacturers' championships

Category VII/VIII

References

FIA E-Rally Regularity Cup seasons
Alternative Energies Cup